In English law, a vitiating factor in the common law of contract is a factor that can affect the validity of a contract. The concept has been adopted in other common law jurisdictions, including the USA.

A vitiating factor is one which spoils the contract, rendering it imperfect. The standard remedy is rescission, but damages may also be available. (By contrast, the standard remedy for breach of contract is damages, with repudiation available for serious breach only).

See also
Good faith
US contract law
Duress in American law
German contract law
French contract law
Principles of European Contract Law Arts 4:107, 4:116 and 4:117
Misleading or deceptive conduct
Tort of deceit

Notes

English contract law